The Togo leaf-toed gecko (Hemidactylus matschiei) is a species of gecko, a lizard in the family Gekkonidae. The species is endemic to West Africa.

Etymology
The specific name, matschiei, is in honor of German zoologist Paul Matschie.

Geographic range
H. matschiei is found in Nigeria and Togo.

Reproduction
H. matschiei is oviparous.

References

Further reading
Loveridge A (1947). "Revision of the African Lizards of the Family Gekkonidae". Bulletin of the Museum of Comparative Zoölogy at Harvard College 98 (1): 1–469 + Plates 1–7. (Hemidactylus matschiei, new combination, pp. 109–110).
Tornier G (1901). "Die Crocodile, Schildkröten und Eidechsen in Togo ". Archiv für Naturgeschichte 67, Beiheft [= Supplement]: 65–88. (Bunocnemis matschiei, new species, p. 71). (in German).

Hemidactylus
Geckos of Africa
Reptiles of West Africa
Reptiles of Nigeria
Fauna of Togo
Reptiles described in 1901
Taxa named by Gustav Tornier